Reece Anthony Clive Hall-Johnson (born 9 May 1995) is an English footballer who plays as a right back for Wrexham.

He started his career at Cambridge United academy and joined Norwich City academy at the age of 11. Hall-Johnson was part of the FA Youth Cup winning squad of Norwich in 2013. He made his professional debut in 2014 but was released in 2016. After being released, he had spells at Maidstone United and Bishop's Stortford before securing a move to Braintree Town in October 2016. After trialling since September, Hall-Johnson signed for Grimsby Town in October 2017.

Career

Norwich City

Early career
Hall-Johnson was born in Aylesbury and grew up in Cambridge. Hall-Johnson began his career in the youth system at Cambridge United before joining Norwich City at the age of 11. He became an academy scholar in the summer of 2012 and was in the winning FA Youth Cup squad with Norwich in May 2013.

In December 2013, he signed a professional contract until the summer of 2016. He signed another one-year contract on 18 September 2015 with the option of another year. He made his professional debut in Norwich's 3–1 Football League Cup victory against Crawley Town on 26 August 2014. Hall-Johnson was released by Norwich in June 2016 after his contract expired.

Maidstone United
Hall-Johnson was listed in the squad for Cambridge in a pre-season fixture against St Neots Town 9 July 2016. On 7 August 2016, National League side Maidstone United announced that they had signed Hall-Johnson on a free transfer, after first choice right-back Callum Driver was injured in Maidstone's 1–0 loss away to Aldershot Town the previous week. He subsequently joined National League South side Bishop's Stortford and made one appearance in September 2016.

Braintree Town
In October 2016, Hall-Johnson moved to his third club of the season, Braintree Town. He was sent off for a two-footed tackle on Frankie Raymond on 2 January 2017 in a 3–0 defeat at Dagenham & Redbridge. During his time at Braintree, he made 25 league appearances with 5 goals and 5 assists.

Grimsby Town
In September 2017, Hall-Johnson went on trial with EFL League Two side Grimsby Town. He appeared in two reserve games against Hartlepool United on 5 September 2017 and Notts County on 19 September 2017.

On 16 October 2017, he signed for Grimsby on a one-year contract, after impressing manager Russell Slade and assistant Paul Wilkinson on his trial. Hall-Johnson re-joined his former academy manager Paul Wilkinson and fellow players Sam Kelly, Ben Killip and Diallang Jaiyesimi who he played with at Norwich City. 
Hall-Johnson signed for National League side Chester three days later, on a three-month deal. He made his debut for Chester on 21 October 2017 in a 2–1 defeat at home to Boreham Wood. On 23 October 2017, he scored the second goal for Chester in a 3–2 home victory over Barrow, a volley from the edge of the box. He made eleven appearances and scored one goal for Chester before the loan expired on 9 January 2018.
Having returned from his loan spell at Chester, he made his debut on 3 February 2018 for Grimsby in a 1–1 draw against Cheltenham Town.

Northampton Town
On 17 June 2019, Hall-Johnson joined League Two side Northampton Town on a one-year deal.

Wrexham
On 24 August 2020, Hall-Johnson joined National League side Wrexham.

Personal life
His cousin is Robert Hall who plays for Barnet FC.

Career statistics

Notes

Honours
Norwich City
FA Youth Cup: 2012–13

Wrexham
FA Trophy runner-up: 2021–22

References

External links
Reece Hall-Johnson profile at the Grimsby Town F.C. website
Reece Hall-Johnson at Soccerbase

Living people
1995 births
Place of birth missing (living people)
English footballers
Association football defenders
Norwich City F.C. players
Maidstone United F.C. players
Bishop's Stortford F.C. players
Braintree Town F.C. players
Grimsby Town F.C. players
Chester F.C. players
Northampton Town F.C. players
Wrexham A.F.C. players
English people of Jamaican descent